Ek Veer Ki Ardaas... Veera ( A brother's prayer... Veera) is an Indian television soap opera, that aired on StarPlus and streams on Hotstar, produced under Yash Patnik's Beyond Dream Production. The series premiered on 29 October 2012 and ended on 8 August 2015. It initially starred child actors Harshita Ojha and Bhavesh Balchandani and after a 15-year leap in story in October 2013 it starred Digangana Suryavanshi, Shivin Narang, Vishal Vashishtha, and Farnaz Shetty.

Plot
Rannvijay Singh, an eight-year-old boy lives with his parents, Ratan and Sampooran Singh, who is the Sarpanch of the village. One day a lady named Amrita comes to the door and claims her daughter's father is Sampooran. Ratan insults her but Sampooran arrives and agrees with Amrita. Seeing this, Ratan is heartbroken and locks herself in a room and attempts suicide. Guiltridden, Sampooran leaves the house and Amrita dies at the door due to terminal illness with the child in her arms. Rannvijay, not aware of the adults' history, takes in the infant and names her Veera, taking care of her like a mother. He soon sends her to the city to complete her education as she grows up to be a lively and brave girl.

15 years later
Veera returns home and tries to open a solar plant in Pritampura. She reunites with her childhood bully, a grown-up, rowdy Baldev, whose righteous father Balwant is now the Sarpanch. Veera and Baldev fall in love during their training of farm equipment, and an aspiring singer Rannvijay also marries Baldev's sister Gunjan and Veera's childhood best friend who had always dreamt of visiting London.

Rannvijay wins an esteemed music competition, and the stardom gets to Gunjan's head as she accepts advertising offers and also begins gambling in order to obtain cash for her luxuries. Gunjan soon gets pregnant but aborts the child for her career, damaging her chances of getting pregnant forever, making her finally realise her mistakes.

After Baldev is mistakenly blamed of a crime arranged by the local policeman Rajveer who is obsessed with Veera, she marries Baldev to save her from her brother's wrath. Baldev is soon acquitted and their marriage is accepted by the family.

Pritampura further falls victim to terrorists which takes away Ratan's life, and a grieving Rannvijay and Veera struggle to come to terms with it. Veera soon discovers she is pregnant and vows to let Rannvijay and Gunjan raise the child as the serial ends on the day of Rakshabandhan.

Cast

Main
 Digangana Suryavanshi as Adult Veera Kaur– Amrita and Sampooran's daughter; Ranvijay's half-sister; Gunjan's best friend; Baldev's wife (2013–2015)
 Harshita Ojha as Young Veera Kaur Sampooran Singh (2012–13)
 Shivin Narang as Adult Ranvijay "Ranvi" Singh– Ratan and Sampooran's son; Veera's half-brother; Gunjan's husband (2013–2015)
 Bhavesh Balchandani as Young Ranvijay Sampooran Singh (2012–13)
 Vishal Vashishtha as Adult Baldev Singh– Balwant and Bansuri's son; Gunjan's brother; Veera's husband (2013–2015)
 Devish Ahuja as Young Baldev Singh (2012–2013)
 Farnaz Shetty as Adult Gunjan Kaur– Baldev's sister; Veera's best friend; Ranvijay's wife (2013–2015)
 Spandan Chaturvedi/Kalyani Badeka as Child Gunjan (2012)
 Arishfa Khan as Young Gunjan Balwant Singh (2012–13)

Recurring 
• Abhijeet Sooryvanshe as Trip adviser  (Negative)
 Sneha Wagh as Ratanjeet "Ratan" Singh– Sampooran's wife; Ranvijay's mother (2012–15)
 Sudhanshu Pandey as Sampooran Singh– Ratan's husband; Ranvijay and Veera's father (2012–2013)
 Shagufta Ali as Moti Chaiji, Sampooran's aunt, Ranvijay and Veera's grandaunt (2012–15)
 Kapil Nirmal as Nihaal Singh, Sampooran's friend (2013–2014)
 Aastha Chaudhary as Amrita Singh- Veera's mother (2012–2013)
 Kulbir Badersonas Veera's maternal grandmother, Amrita's mother (2012)
 Harsh Vashisht as Kartar Singh (2012–13)
 Samikssha Batnagar as Gurpreet Kartar Singh, Kartar's wife (2012–13)
 Yajuvendra Singh as Balwant Singh, Bansuri's husband, Baldev and Gunjan's father (2012–2015)
 Vishavpreet Kaur as Bansuri Balwant Singh, Balwant's wife, Baldev and Gunjan's mother (2012–15)
 Nishika Kataria as Baby Veera (2012)
 Shazil Khan as Child Dalbeer (2012)
 Jalina Thakur as Pooja Sharma (2012–13)
 Daya Shankar Pandey as Surjeet Singh (2013–2014)
 Ankit Bathla as Karan Khanna, Veera's friend/former love interest (2013–14)
 Ankit Shah as Dalbeer Singh (2013–14)
 Niilam Paanchal as Amrit Kaur (2014)
 Priyamvada Kant as Simran Kaur, Baldev's ex-fiancée (2014)
 Rumi Khan as Bakhtawar Singh (2014)
 Ranveer Chahal as Music Engineer (2014)
 Kanika Kotnala as Chanchali Singh (2014)
 Gagan Anand as Billa Singh (2014–15)
 Shaizal as Jaggi Singh, Ranvijay's friend (2014–15)
 Prashant Chawla as Sahil, Nihal Singh's assistant in Poland (2014)
 Rohit Bakshi as Reality Show Host (2014)
 Vivek Dahiya as Inspector Rajveer Thakur, Veera's ex-fiancé (2014)
 Keerti Nagpure as Geet Singh, Manjeet's daughter-in-law (2015)
 Vrudhi Jakra as Deepu Singh, Geet's daughter, Baldev and Gunjan's niece (2015)
 Mayank Gandhi as Dilawar Singh (2015)
 Chaitanya Choudhury as Professor Rahul (2015)
 Usha Bachani as Manjeet Singh, Baldev and Gunjan's aunt (2015)
Aditya Deshmukh as Jhappi

Guest appearances
 Kratika Sengar as dancer at Baldev and Karan's farewell party (2014)
 Shibani Kashyap as Megha Kapoor (2014)
 Raj Singh as Anmol (2014)
Ahmad Harhash as Kabir Singh Roy and Karen’s farewell party (2010) (2017)

Production

Development
Before its premiere, it was titled as Sooli Upar Sej Piya Ki but was later changed to Ek Veer Ki Ardaas... Veera. The series is based on the backdrop of Punjab which premiered on 29 October 2012 replacing the series Mann Ki Awaaz... Pratigya. The title track of the series was composed and sung by composer Anand Raj Anand.

Within three months after its premiere, Veera was supposed to take a ten-year leap in its storyline. However, with the popularity of the children leads Bhavesh Balchandani and Harshita Ojha playing Ranveer and Veera, the makers postpone the leap and continued the story with them because of which Rahul Sharma who was supposed to replace Balachandani as adult Ranveer went on to do the serial Ek Ghar Banaunga.

In May 2013, the sequence of a tiger attacking the village was shot using a real tiger.

In September 2014, Darshan Raval, the contestant of the reality singing show India's Raw Star of StarPlus lend over his voice for the sequence where character Ranveer played by Narang participates in a singing competition and the sequence was filmed at the sets of India's Raw Star in Filmcity. The song sung by character Ranveer was penned by Shaarib Sabri and Toshi Sabri who also appeared as the judges of the show in the series.

Casting
In October 2013, it took a leap of 15 years where Shivin Narang and Digangana Suryavanshi replaced Balchandani and Ojha was adult Ranveer and Veera as the lead characters. Post leap, Farnaaz Shetty and Vishal Vashishtha were also cast for the lead roles of adult Gunjan and Baldev paired opposite Narang and Suryavanshi whose childhood characters played by Arishfa Khan and Devish Ahuja were recurring roles. Initially Narang rejected the role of Ranvijay when offered by the makers but later agreed for which he said, "I read about the show and realised that the storyline is very different. And my parents also forced me to accept the offer." Vashishtha auditioned for both Ranveer and Baldev's characters, but got selected for the role of Baldev for which he initially was sceptical to accept the negative role while makers convinced him.

In August 2013, Kapil Nirmal who entered the series in January 2013 quit the series with the end of his role. However, in August 2014 he returned when makers approached him but soon in December 2014 he quit the series, unhappy with the shaping of his role and his character was killed. Sneha Wagh who quit in January 2014 owing her marriage re-entered the series after the break in April 2014.

Initially, Sana Saeed was roped for a guest role of a dancer in 2014. Unsatisfied with the charges demanded by Saeed, Kratika Sengar was cast by the makers. Nisha Nagpal was supposed to play the role of Simran but could not when the makers of Masakali of Sahara One filed a complaint in CINTAA (Cine and TV Artistes’ Association) stating that she was in contact with them. Thus, she was replaced overnight by Priyamvada Kant in December 2014.

Cancellation
The show which was to end in December 2014, received an extension of six to eight months and soon in January 2015 it was shifted from its night 10:30pm slot to the evening 5:00pm (IST) slot. In September 2015, the series was confirmed going off air and ended on 10 August 2015.

Filming
Based on backdrop of Punjab, the series is mainly filmed in sets at Powai in Mumbai. Besides some sequences were filmed at some parts of Punjab, Amritsar Golden Temple and villages surrounding it and Delhi. In July 2014, a sequence was shot at Poland.

Adaptations 

In 2014, the series was dubbed and aired on Zee Telugu in Telugu as Meena. A dubbed version of the serial was telecast in Tamil as En Anbu Thangaikku on Vijay TV, but was discontinued after only 400 episodes were broadcast. A dubbed version of the serial was telecast in Malayalam as Manasaveera on Asianet.  The series was broadcast on Indonesia in ANTV in their native language. Besides, it was dubbed and aired in 50 languages in different countries worldwide.
It remade into Star Maa as Telugu television series Rakhi Poornima. It also remade in Bengali as Raakhi Bandhan which aired on Star Jalsha.

Reception
The first episode of the series garnered an average rating of 2.1 TVR. However, it started to rise gradually. In March 2013, it garnered 3.1 TVR. In week 15 of 2013, it was at fifth position while the following week it dropped to tenth position in Hindi GEC list with 2.1 TVR. In first week of August 2013, it was at tenth position with 4933 TVT (Television Viewership in Thousands). In week 50 of 2013, it was the tenth most watched Hindi GEC fiction with 2.8 TVR.

In first week of 2014, it garnered 2.4 TVR while in the week three and five it got 2.4 and 2.7 TVRs.

References

External links 
 

StarPlus original programming
2012 Indian television series debuts
2015 Indian television series endings
Indian drama television series
Television shows set in Punjab, India